Ein Carmel (lit. Carmel Spring) is a kibbutz in northern Israel. Located near Atlit, it falls under the jurisdiction of Hof HaCarmel Regional Council.

History
The kibbutz was established in 1950 by former residents of Ein HaYam and Ramat Rachel. The founding charter of the settlement was signed at the end of the War of Independence by four adults and two children from each of the groups of settlers.

The village is located one kilometer from the former Palestinian village of al-Mazar that was depopulated during fighting in the 1948 Arab-Israeli war, and some of the houses of Ein Carmel are land that had belonged to the village. Although most residents had fled in May 1948, the village was finally destroyed during an operation in mid-July.

Notable people
 Aaron Ben-Ze'ev (born 1949), Israeli philosopher and President of the University of Haifa

References

External links
Official website

Kibbutzim
Kibbutz Movement
Populated places established in 1950
1950 establishments in Israel
Populated places in Haifa District